Achim Schwenk is a German physicist. He became a professor at the Institute of Nuclear Physics at the Darmstadt University of Technology in 2009.

Professional Activities 
 since 2011: Editor in Chief, Journal of Physics G: Nuclear and Particle Physics
 2010-2013: Editorial Board, European Journal of Physics A: Hadrons and Nuclei

Honors 
 2010:	ARCHES Prize, BMBF and Minerva Foundation
 2011:	Athene Teaching Award, TU Darmstadt
 2012:	ERC Starting Grant
 2012:	Fellow of the American Physical Society
 2013:	Zdzislaw Szymanski Prize

External links 
 CV of Achim Schwenk at the TU Darmstadt

Academic staff of Technische Universität Darmstadt
Living people
20th-century births
German astrophysicists
German nuclear physicists
Year of birth missing (living people)
Fellows of the American Physical Society